"The Last Man" was an American television play broadcast live from CBS Television City in Hollywood on January 9, 1958, as part of the second season of the CBS television series Playhouse 90. Aaron Spelling wrote the teleplay, John Frankenheimer directed, and Paul Newman hosted. Sterling Hayden, Carolyn Jones, and Wallace Ford starred. It was later made into a feature film, One Foot in Hell.

Plot
Set in the old West, Mitch Barrett's wife dies during childbirth. Barrett blames the heartlessness of the town's leaders who failed to assist. He seeks revenge by robbing the bank where the rich cattleman who runs the town has deposited his money.

Cast
The following performers received screen credit for their performances:

 Sterling Hayden - Mitch Barrett
 Carolyn Jones - Julie
 Wallace Ford - Mule Rogers
 Hurd Hatfield - Ivers
 Mark Richman - Stu
 Lee Philips - Dan
 Malcolm Atterbury
 Stafford Repp
 Byron Foulger
 Douglas Henderson
 Burt Mustin
 Woodrow Chambliss
 Paul Bryar
 Michael Ross
 Jason Johnson
 James McCallion
 Tess Landess
 Robert Cross (as Bob Cross)
 Garry Walberg
 Claudia Bryar
 Louise Fletcher
 Julia Meade
 Earl Parker
 Helen Richman - Mrs. Barrett
 Charles Bail - Cavalry Sergeant

References

1958 television plays
1958 American television episodes
Playhouse 90 (season 2) episodes